Fudbalski klub Borac Banja Luka (Serbian Cyrillic: Фудбалски клуб Бopaц Бања Лука) is a Bosnian professional association football club, based in the city of Banja Luka, Bosnia and Herzegovina, and is the major part of the Borac Banja Luka Sports Society. Borac Banja Luka is one of the most popular football clubs in Bosnia and Herzegovina. The name Borac means "Fighter".

Currently, Borac is a part of the Premier League of Bosnia and Herzegovina and plays its home matches at the Banja Luka City Stadium, which has a capacity of 10,030 seats.

History

Early years (1926–1953)

The football club Borac Banja Luka was founded on 4 July 1926. Originally it was named Radnički sportski klub Borac, which means Labour Sports Club Borac, Borac meaning "Fighter", and its roots come from the relation the club had with local labour movements during the first half of the 20th century. The club was founded by a group of football enthusiasts including the writer, activist and People's Hero of Yugoslavia Veselin Masleša, Rudolf "Rudi" Hiter, Savo Novaković, Nikola Pucar, Brane Pucar, Mustafa Softić, Nikola Kuković, Žarko Vranješević, Mile Stefanović and Brane Stefanović among others. They financed the club believing that by backing and supporting it, they would directly help promote the labour movements struggle that was underway. The name "Borac" was given by Masleša who said: "If you are going to fight for workers' rights, why don't you give the club name Borac?".

The club's first president was Rudolf Hiter, and Savo Novaković was named vice president, with a supervisory board headed by Đoko Jovanović. As football attracted more and more attention in the city on the Vrbas river, Banja Luka got the right to organise its own sub-association gathering the clubs of the entire Krajina region, a new, bigger and modern stadium was built. The opening ceremony took place on September 5, 1937, on the ground of the present-day Banja Luka City Stadium.

The club's first success in this early period came in 1928 when RSK Borac won a tournament played in Sarajevo. Before World War II, the major club in Banja Luka was ŠK Krajišnik, however, after 1945, it was disbanded, and Borac replaced Krajišnik as the city's main club. Borac played conference leagues in order to qualify for the re-established Yugoslav First League were defeated Sloboda Novi Grad 14–3 on aggregate, FK Kozara from Banja Luka with 8–4 on aggregate and Borac Kozarska Dubica 7–0 on aggregate and became Banja Luka district champions. In 1945, RSK Borac has renamed FK Borac Banja Luka and played for two years in the Yugoslav Third League, before it was promoted to the Yugoslav Second League in 1948.

Decades of success in the first and second league (1960–1992)
In 1961, Borac was promoted to the Yugoslav First League for the first time but was instantly dropped back down at the end of the season. The club had to wait for almost a decade to the return to the top flight. It was in the 1970–71 season, and the club stayed in the top league for four consecutive seasons. In this period, precisely in 1974, Borac achieved the Yugoslav Cup final. They were defeated by Hajduk Split in Belgrade, and as the runner-up, they have provided placement for the 1975–76 European Cup Winners' Cup season. In the first round of Cup Winners' Cup, Borac played against US Rumelange from Luxembourg. The first leg was played in Banja Luka where Borac recorded a record win in European competitions by a 9–0.

The second leg was won by Borac by 1–5, meaning 14–1 on aggregate, and played in the second round against R.S.C. Anderlecht. The "Red-Blues" won the home match but it was 1–3 on aggregate at the end for the Belgians, who became winners of the European Cup Winners' Cup that season. Borac Banja Luka was the only team who beat R.S.C Anderlecht in one match (at home by 1–0) during the cup season. In the 1974–75 season, Borac played in the second league, but the club achieved a quick promotion and thus ensured the beginning of a new 5-year first league period that lasted until 1980. The following nine seasons, Borac spent in the second League, before a final top league period between 1989 and 1992. Borac's best placement in the first League was in 1992, when it finished the season as 4th. In total, Borac played 487 matches in Yugoslav First League during a 46 years long period.

Memorable years (1988–1992)

Yugoslav Cup winner (1988)
From 1988 to 1992, Borac enjoyed the best period in its long history. In 1988, Borac achieved its biggest success. Under coach Husnija Fazlić Borac won the Yugoslav Cup, the second major football competition in former Yugoslav football and became the only second league club that ever achieved this. In the final, Borac defeated Yugoslav football giant Red Star by 0–1 at JNA stadium in Belgrade.   The historic goal was scored by Senad Lupić, one of the Borac's legends. At the ceremony, the president of Yugoslav Football Association Antun Čilić gave the golden plaques to Borac players and the head coach. The next day, tens of thousands of Borac supporters gathered at Krajina square in Banja Luka and gave their team a hero's welcome.

First European title (1992)
In 1992, Borac won its first international trophy, the Mitropa Cup.
The club won the cup in the Italian city Foggia.

At that time there was an ongoing civil war in Yugoslavia, but despite that, they travelled to Italy in the hope to write history. After the elimination of U.S. Foggia in front of 30,000 spectators, Borac met in the final BVSC Budapest at Pino Zaccheria Stadium. Filipović scored but gave only a temporary advantage to Borac because the Hungarians were equalized by Tuboly. That was the result of regular time, so the winner was decided by penalties. Borac won 5–3 from the white spot and got the trophy. Sašivarević, Stavljanin, Filipović, Bilbija, and Simeunović scored for Borac, and goalkeeper Simeunović saved his goal twice. Borac head coach was Smilevski, who was recently named the member of Borac's "Best Eleven" squad in its history. Borac played a total of twelve games in UEFA competitions and has never lost a European match at its home ground. Also, seven Borac players have participated in the Yugoslav national football team in its history.

Recent years (2001–present)

The First League of the Republika Srpska was the top flight of the Republika Srpska before 2002.
Borac won the Republika Srpska championship three times (2001, 2006 and 2008). Their 2008 title was won dominantly with 14 points ahead of Sloga Doboj. Borac has won five Republika Srpska Cups, in 1995 against Rudar Prijedor, 1996 against Jedinstvo Brčko, 2009 against Radnik Bijeljina, 2011 again against the club from Bijeljina and in 2012 against Sloboda Mrkonjić Grad. In 2002, the Premier League of Bosnia and Herzegovina was created as three national competitions were merged in one.

It became the country's most prestigious level of football competition. Also, since 2002, the clubs from the entire country are competing in the Bosnia and Herzegovina Football Cup. In 2010, Borac won the Bosnia and Herzegovina Cup and finished third in the national championship. During the 2010–11 UEFA Europa League season, they played in the second round against FC Lausanne-Sport but were knocked out in front of sold-out Banja Luka City Stadium with 1–2 on aggregate for the Swiss club. In 2011, Borac became the football champion of Bosnia and Herzegovina with only 4 defeats and 15 conceded goals during 30 matches. The club won also the Republika Srpska Cup. In the following 2011–12 UEFA Champions League season, Borac starts the qualifying matches against Maccabi Haifa. The first match was played in Haifa, where Borac got the lead by the goal from Raspudić, a goal that surprised Maccabi Haifa as they were controlling the game. A minute into the first half's extra time, Amasha equalized for Maccabi Haifa. But then, an inexplicable black hole  occurred at Borac performance and they conceded three goals in only three minutes and Borac lost by 5–1. In the second leg, Borac showed great performance and won 3–2 by two goals from Krunić and one from Vidaković, however, the tournament was over for them. In 2012, Borac finished the national championship third and qualified for the European football competition season. Borac got Čelik Nikšić from Montenegro as their opponent. Borac was knocked out by the away goal rule (3-3a).

Colours and crest

Colours
Borac Banja Luka's traditional home colours are red and blue with white socks (colours that are contained on the Yugoslav flag). Borac has maintained the red-blue shirt for its home kit throughout the history of the club. It's traditional away colours are all blue or all red. The club's kit is after long-standing Serbian sports clothing company NAAI, currently, new manufactured by Diadora, an Italian sports clothing company.

Crest
Borac Banja Luka's present crest contains the name of the club and the name of the City of Banja Luka in the background formed from the sections that are coloured as the Serbian flag. On the top of the crest, the year of the club foundation is located. In addition, the whole crest is framed in gold colour.

Stadium

The home field of Borac is the Banja Luka City Stadium. It has 10,030 seats and is one of the most modern stadiums in the country. The stadium was built in 1937 and its main donator was Bogoljub Kujundžić, the ban of the Vrbas banovina. Since then, the stadium underwent several expansions and reconstructions in the years 1973, 1981, 2010 and 2012. In 2010, the stadium underwent a complete reconstruction. New seats were installed on east and west stands, locker rooms were renovated, a completely new VIP lounge and room for media was built, new lighting, sound systems and video surveillance were installed, and trophy and technical rooms were renovated. In 2012, the new north stand was built with a capacity of 2,492 seats, which increased the total capacity of the stadium to 9,730. According to recent plans, the east stand will be covered by a roof in the upcoming years. The construction of the south stand began, which will increase the total capacity to approximately 13,000 seats.

New Stadium
In 2008, an expert committee has chosen the concept of building a new stadium. The new stadium will have 30,000 seats, and the whole complex will cover 205,000 square meters. It will include two additional football fields, tennis, basketball and volleyball courts. The cost of the whole project is estimated to be €50  million and it will meet the highest FIFA and UEFA demands.

Supporters
As one of the most successful football clubs in the country, Borac always had a considerable number of supporters.
The organized supporters of FK Borac are known as Lešinari (Serbian Cyrillic: Лешинари) and they are the oldest organized supporter group in Republika Srpska, Bosnia and Herzegovina. They were established in 1987.
The gathering point of the club's most loyal and passionate fans was the East stand of Banja Luka City Stadium until 2017 when it was changed to the North stand.
Borac has big strong and loyal brotherhood with Vojvodina fans Firma and friendship with fans of Genoa.

Rivalries

Željezničar-Borac Banja Luka rivalry

Since the season 2008–09, the time when Borac started to be standard in the Bosnian Premier League once again, a great rivalry started to develop between them and FK Željezničar. Starting from the 2009–10 season the two teams mainly competed against each other for one of the titles (the league title or national cup) and even the attendance almost got on pair with the acclaimed Sarajevo derby. The rivalry also has a root in the fact that Sarajevo and Banja Luka are, by a good margin, the two biggest cities in Bosnia and Herzegovina, the first being also the capital of the whole country while the second takes the role as the de facto capital of Republika Srpska entity. Since the independence of Bosnia and Herzegovina, the teams met each other 22 times (6 of which are in a national cup), although they played the first time against each other in 1947 Yugoslav Cup. In those 22 matches, Željezničar won 12 times, while Borac managed to win 7 times, with 3 matches ending in a draw. The goal difference is 31:19 in favour of Željezničar (Not including results from the 2015 to 2016 season).

Honours

Domestic

League
Premier League of Bosnia and Herzegovina:
 Winners (2): 2010–11, 2020–21
 First League of Republika Srpska:
 Winners (5): 2000–01, 2005–06, 2007–08, 2016–17, 2018–19 (record)
Runners-up (1): 1997–98

Cups
Yugoslav Cup:
 Winners (1): 1987–88
Runners-up (1): 1974
Bosnia and Herzegovina Cup:
 Winners (1): 2009–10
Runners-up (2): 2003–04, 2020–21
Republika Srpska Cup:
 Winners (5): 1994–95, 1995–96, 2008–09, 2010–11, 2011–12

European
Mitropa Cup:
 Winners (1): 1992

Recent seasons

European record

Legend: GF = Goals For. GA = Goals Against. GD = Goal Difference.

List of matches

Club ranking

UEFA coefficient

2022–23 season

As of 29 May 2022. Source

Players

Current squad

Players with multiple nationalities

  Bojan Pavlović
  Alen Jurilj
  Nikola Ninković
  Momčilo Mrkaić
  Ivan Lagundžić 
  Nikola Ćetković

Youth players

Players on loan

Technical staff

Club management

Former players

World Cup players
 2014 FIFA World Cup
 Asmir Avdukić

Managerial history

 Mirko Kokotović (1960–62)
 Miroslav Brozović (1963)
 Momčilo Spasojević (1963–1967)
 Đorđe Detlinger (1967–1968)
 Krešimir Arapović (1968–1970)
 Franjo Glaser (1970–72)
 Gojko Zec (1972–73)
 Vladimir Šimunić (1973)
 Miljenko Mihić (1975–76)
 Husnija Fazlić (1977–84)
 Zoran Smileski (1984–85)
 Husnija Fazlić (1985–88)
 Josip Kuže (1988–89)
 Stanko Poklepović (1989–90)
 Mirko Bazić (1990)
 Boris Marović (1990)
 Zoran Smileski (1990–92)
 Slobodan Karalić (2002)
 Stojan Malbašić (2002 – March 2003)
 Borče Sredojević (2003)
 Nikola Rakojević (2003 – June 2004)
 Dragan Vukša (June 2004 – 2004)
 Slavoljub Stojanović  (2004–2005)
 Zoran Smileski (2005 – June 2006)
 Mihajlo Bošnjak (June 2006 – March 2007)
 Stanislav Karasi (March 2007 – June 2007)
 Milomir Odović (September 2007 – September 2008)
 Vlado Jagodić (September 16, 2008 – June 11, 2009)
 Velimir Stojnić (July 1, 2009 – January 11, 2010)
 Zoran Marić (January 12, 2010 – August 2, 2010)
 Vlado Jagodić (August 3, 2010 – June 4, 2011)
 Zvjezdan Cvetković (June 4, 2011 – October 3, 2011)
 Velimir Stojnić (October 3, 2011 – March 17, 2012)
 Slaviša Božičić (March 19, 2012 – July 13, 2012)
 Slobodan Starčević (July 18, 2012 – May 20, 2013)
 Dragan Jović (June 25, 2013 – March 18, 2014)
 Vinko Marinović (March 18, 2014 – March 25, 2015)
 Vlado Jagodić (March 27, 2015 – August 31, 2015)
 Petar Kurćubić (September 3, 2015 – October 28, 2015)
 Željko Vranješ (Oct 29, 2015 – December 31, 2015)
 Aleksandar Janjić (January 21, 2016 – March 6, 2016)
 Borče Sredojević (March 6, 2016 – May 20, 2016)
 Zoran Dragišić (May 20, 2016 – August 23, 2016)
 Vlado Jagodić (August 23, 2016 – October 10, 2016)
 Vule Trivunović (October 11, 2016 – May 26, 2017)
 Marko Tešić (caretaker) (May 26, 2017 – June 7, 2017)
 Željko Vranješ (June 8, 2017 – August 30, 2017)
 Zoran Milinković (August 30, 2017 – November 22, 2017)
 Igor Janković (caretaker) (November 22, 2017 – January 10, 2018)
 Igor Janković (January 10, 2018 – March 12, 2018)
 Marko Maksimović (caretaker) (March 13, 2018 – March 22, 2018)
 Darko Vojvodić (March 22, 2018 – June 5, 2019)
 Branislav Krunić (June 9, 2019 – March 5, 2020)
 Vlado Jagodić (March 5, 2020 – December 21, 2020)
 Marko Maksimović (December 26, 2020 – July 28, 2021)
 Zoran Milinković (July 30, 2021 – August 18, 2021)
 Nemanja Miljanović (August 18, 2021 – April 3, 2022)
 Tomislav Ivković (April 4, 2022 – June 3, 2022)
 Nenad Lalatović (June 10, 2022 – August 26, 2022)
 Vinko Marinović (August 28, 2022 – present)

Notes

References

External links

Official website 
Sport association Borac 
Official supporters' website 
Borac Banja Luka at UEFA.com

 
Association football clubs established in 1926
Football clubs in Yugoslavia
Football clubs in Republika Srpska
Football clubs in Bosnia and Herzegovina
Sport in Banja Luka
1926 establishments in Bosnia and Herzegovina